Alina Vyacheslavivna Berezhna (formerly Stadnyk, née Makhynia, ; born 3 January 1991) is a Ukrainian freestyle wrestler. She is the 2013 World champion in women's freestyle 67 kg.

Personal life
Makhynia was born on 3 January 1991 in Chita, Zabaykalsky Krai, Russia. She moved to Ukraine in 1994.

Career
Competing in the freestyle 67 kg category, Stadnyk won gold at the 2009 World Junior Championships in Ankara and the 2013 European Championships in Tbilisi. In September 2013, she was awarded gold at the World Championships in Budapest, after defeating Stacie Anaka of Canada.

In 2014, Stadnyk began appearing in 69 kg freestyle. She took bronze at the 2014 European Championships in Vantaa and gold at the 2015 European Games in Baku, defeating Israeli Ilana Kratysh in the finals.

She competed for Ukraine at the 2016 Summer Olympics in the women's freestyle 69 kg event.

She represented Ukraine at the 2019 World Beach Games in Doha, Qatar and she won the silver medal in the women's 70kg beach wrestling event.

In 2020, she won one of the bronze medals in the women's 68 kg event at the Individual Wrestling World Cup held in Belgrade, Serbia.

References

External links
 
 
 
 
 

1991 births
Living people
Ukrainian female sport wrestlers
Olympic wrestlers of Ukraine
Wrestlers at the 2016 Summer Olympics
World Wrestling Championships medalists
Universiade medalists in wrestling
Universiade bronze medalists for Ukraine
European Games gold medalists for Ukraine
European Games medalists in wrestling
Wrestlers at the 2015 European Games
People from Chita, Zabaykalsky Krai
European Wrestling Championships medalists
Medalists at the 2013 Summer Universiade
21st-century Ukrainian women